Hemeroplanis immaculalis is a species of moth in the family Erebidae.

The MONA or Hodges number for Hemeroplanis immaculalis is 8476.

References

Further reading

 
 
 

Boletobiinae
Articles created by Qbugbot
Moths described in 1875